The 2022 CMT Music Awards, the 56th edition of the awards ceremony, were held in Nashville, Tennessee on April 11, 2022, at the Nashville Municipal Auditorium and locations in and around Nashville, Tennessee. The ceremony was hosted by Kelsea Ballerini (virtually), Kane Brown, and Anthony Mackie. The ceremony marked the final appearance and public performance of the country music duo, The Judds, as Naomi Judd died on April 30.

Background 
The CMT Music Awards is country music's only entirely fan-voted awards show. Following the long-time CBS produced Academy of Country Music Awards departed from the network, Paramount Global announced that the live televised ceremony would move to CBS from CMT. While CBS will carry the award show live, CMT will have week-long special programming and events capped by exclusive "director’s cut" airing of the ceremony on CMT.

Judds Reunion 
On April 1, CMT announced that Wynonna and Naomi Judd would be reuniting for a performance on the 2022 CMT Music Awards. The reunion comes ahead of the duo's induction into the Country Music Hall of Fame in May and Final Tour in the Fall. They performed their hit song, “Love Can Build a Bridge,” from the Country Music Hall of Fame in Nashville. The performance marked The Judds’ only nationally televised award show performance in more than twenty years. The reunion performance was met with positive reception. People Magazine called the performance "stunning", and Billboard called the reunion a "glorious return and a welcome comeback". This would be the final live performance for Naomi Judd and for The Judds as a duo; on April 30, 2022, just nineteen days after their performance, and the day before their induction into the Country Music Hall of Fame, Wynonna and Ashley Judd announced that Naomi had died.

Ballerini tests positive for COVID-19  
On the day of the live telecast, Ballerini announced that she had tested positive for COVID-19. She was asymptomatic, and said she would be able to co-host and perform from her home, with help from CMT and CBS. Kane Brown, who hosted the previous year's ceremony with Ballerini, would step in and shared the main stage with Mackie as a co-host.

Winners and nominees 
Nominees were announced on March 16, 2022. Winners are in bold.

Performers 
Performances include both the live performances shown on CBS and extended cut performance shown exclusively on CMT.

Ram Trucks Side Stage performances 
 Priscilla Block, Breland, Jessie James Decker, Parker McCollum, Elvie Shane and Caitlyn Smith

Presenters 
On April 7, 2022, CMT announced a list of presenters, their exact roles to be determined during the ceremony.

 Rob Corddry, presented Collaborative Video of the Year
 Jimmie Allen, introduced Old Dominion
 Jordan Davis, introduced Thomas Rhett and Riley Green
 Billy Gibbons, honored the 20th anniversary of CMT Crossroads
 LeAnn Rimes, introduced Mickey Guyton and Black Pumas
 Dylan Scott, presented Breakthrough Video of the Year
 Craig Morgan and Mike Singletary, introduced Walker Hayes
 Lily Aldridge, introduced Maren Morris and Ryan Hurd
 Dennis Quaid, introduced Cody Johnson
 Martina McBride, presented Female Video of the Year
 Kacey Musgraves, introduced The Judds
 Gabby Barrett and Dustin Lynch, presented Group/Duo Video of the Year
 Gayle King, introduced Jimmie Allen, Monica and Little Big Town and Honored CMT Equal Play
 Joel McHale, presented Male Video of the Year
 Taylor Lautner, introduced Kane Brown
 Bobby Berk, Karamo Brown, Tan France and Antoni Porowski, introduced Miranda Lambert
 Faith Hill and Isabel May, presented Video of the Year

Milestones 

 Carrie Underwood, often referred to as the "Queen of the CMT Awards", won her 24th and 25th CMT Award, extending her record as the most decorated artist in CMT Awards history.
 Kane Brown and Anthony Mackie marked the first time two black hosts have hosted the CMT Awards.

References 

2022 music awards
2022 awards in the United States
CMT Music Awards
April 2022 events in the United States
2022 in Tennessee